Felix C. Antoine (1839 - 1917) was an officer in the Louisiana Colored Volunteer Infantry and a state legislator in Louisiana. He was the younger brother of Caeser Antoine who served in the Louisiana Senate and as Lieutenant Governor of Louisiana. He served in the Louisiana House of Representatives from 1868 to 1872. He also served as harbor master in New Orleans and was a night inspector at its customs house.

He was born in New Orleans.

References

Republican Party members of the Louisiana House of Representatives
19th-century American politicians
1839 births
1917 deaths